Rhodophiala was a genus of herbaceous, perennial and bulbous plants in the Amaryllis family (Amaryllidaceae, subfamily Amaryllidoideae). It consisted of about 30 South American species distributed in southern Brazil, Argentina, and, specially, in Chile. Most of the species are known colloquially as añañuca. It has now been submerged in Zephyranthes.

Description
Rhodophiala species resemble small-flowered Hippeastrum or multiflowered Habranthus species. Their narrow parallel-sided leaves are unlike that of Hippeastrum, more closely resembling that of Habranthus or Zephyranthes.

Taxonomy 
At one stage, Rhodophiala was considered a subgenus of the closely related Hippeastrum.

Although as of February 2016 not yet accepted by the World Checklist of Selected Plant Families a number of species of Rhodophiala have been rehabilitated as Rhodolirium.

Species 
The World Checklist of Selected Plant Families accepted 27 species :

Rhodophiala advena  (Ker Gawl.) Traub – Central Chile
Rhodophiala ananuca  (Phil.) Traub – Northern Chile
Rhodophiala andina  Phil. – Central Chile
Rhodophiala araucana  (Phil.) Traub – distributed Chile to Southern Argentina
Rhodophiala bagnoldii  (Herb.) Traub – Northern and Central Chile
Rhodophiala bakeri  (Phil.) Traub – Central Chile
Rhodophiala berteroana  (Phil.) Traub – Central Chile
Rhodophiala bifida  (Herb.) Traub – distributed Southern Brazil to Argentina (Buenos Aires)
Rhodophiala biflora  Phil. – Chile
Rhodophiala colonum  (Phil.) Traub – Southern Chile
Rhodophiala consobrina  (Phil.) Traub – Central Chile
Rhodophiala flava  (Phil.) Traub – Southern Chile
Rhodophiala fulgens  (Hook.f.) Traub – Central Chile
Rhodophiala gilliesiana  (Herb.) ined. – distributed Chile to Southern Argentina
Rhodophiala lineata  (Phil.) Traub – Chile
Rhodophiala maculata  (L'Hér.) Ravenna – Chile
Rhodophiala moelleri  (Phil.) Traub – Southern Chile
Rhodophiala montana  (Phil.) Traub – Chile
Rhodophiala phycelloides  (Herb.) Hunz. – Chile
Rhodophiala popetana  (Phil.) Traub – Central Chile
Rhodophiala rosea  (Sweet) Traub – Chile
Rhodophiala splendens  (Renjifo) Traub – Central Chile
Rhodophiala tiltilensis  (Traub & Moldenke) Traub – Central Chile

The following species, formerly in Rhodophiala have been transferred to Rhodolirium.
 Rhodophiala andicola   (Poepp.) Traub 
 Rhodophiala chilensis  (L'Hér.) Traub 
 Rhodophiala pratensis  (Poepp.) Traub 
 Rhodophiala rhodolirion  (Baker) Traub

References

Bibliography

External links
Flowers of different species of Rhodophiala from Pacific Bulb Society

Amaryllidoideae
Amaryllidaceae genera
Historically recognized angiosperm genera